Flavio Cipolla was the defending champion but chose not to defend his title.
Brendan Evans won in the final 4–6, 6–3, 6–4, against Florian Mayer.

Seeds

Draw

Final four

Top half

Bottom half

External links
Main Draw
Qualifying Draw

Internationaux de Nouvelle-Caledonie
2009 - Singles